Diocese of Cuttack may refer to:
Roman Catholic Archdiocese of Cuttack-Bhubaneswar (former Diocese of Cuttack)
Diocese of Cuttack (Church of North India)